Inyo County is a county in the eastern central part of the U.S. state of California, located between the Sierra Nevada and the state of Nevada. In the 2020 census, the population was 19,016. The county seat is Independence. Inyo County is on the east side of the Sierra Nevada and southeast of Yosemite National Park in Central California. It contains the Owens River Valley; it is flanked to the west by the Sierra Nevada and to the east by the White Mountains and the Inyo Mountains. With an area of 10,192 square miles (26,397 km2), Inyo is the second-largest county by area in California, after San Bernardino County. Almost one-half of that area is within Death Valley National Park. However, with a population density of 1.8 people per square mile, it also has the second-lowest population density in California, after Alpine County.

History

Present-day Inyo county has been the historic homeland for thousands of years of the Mono, Timbisha, Kawaiisu, and Northern Paiute Native Americans. The descendants of these ancestors continue to live in their traditional homelands in the Owens River Valley and in Death Valley National Park. Worse, the portion north of the 37th parallel had been claimed by Nevada Territory (later the state of Nevada) as part of its westernmost border from 1861 to 1866.

Inyo County was formed in 1866 out of the territory of the unorganized Coso County, which had been created on April 4, 1864, from parts of Mono County and Tulare County.  It acquired more territory from Mono County in 1870 and Kern County and San Bernardino County in 1872.

For many years it has been commonly believed that the county derived its name from the Mono tribe's name for the mountains in its former homeland. Actually the name came to be thought of, mistakenly, as the name of the mountains to the east of the Owens Valley when the first whites there asked the local Owens Valley Paiutes for the name of the mountains to the east. They responded that that was the land of Inyo. They meant by this that those lands belonged to the Timbisha tribe headed by a man whose name was Inyo. Inyo was the name of the headman of one of the Timbisha bands at the time of contact when the first whites, the Bennett-Arcane Party of 1849, wandered, lost, into Death Valley on their expedition to the gold fields of western California. The Owens Valley whites misunderstood the reference and thought that Inyo was the name of the mountains when actually it was the name of the chief, or headman, of the tribe that had those mountains as part of their homeland. In Timbisha, ɨnnɨyun means "it's (or he's) dangerous".

To supply the growing City of Los Angeles, water was diverted from the Owens River into the Los Angeles Aqueduct in 1913. The Owens River Valley cultures and environments changed substantially. From the 1910s to 1930s the Los Angeles Department of Water and Power purchased much of the valley for water rights and control. In 1941 the Los Angeles Department of Water and Power extended the Los Angeles Aqueduct system farther upriver into the Mono Basin.

Natural history
Inyo County is host to a number of natural superlatives. Among them are:
 Mount Whitney, with an elevation of 14,505 feet (4,421 m), the highest point in the contiguous United States, the 12th highest peak in the U.S., and the 24th highest peak in North America.
 Badwater Basin, in Death Valley, the lowest point in North America
 Methuselah, an ancient Bristlecone pine tree and one of the oldest living trees on Earth
 Owens Valley, the deepest valley on the American continents
 Two mountain ranges exceeding  in elevation: The Sierra Nevada and the White Mountains
 Ten of California's twelve peaks which exceed 14,000 feet (a Fourteener) in elevation; the isolated Mount Shasta in northern California, and White Mountain Peak in neighboring Mono County, are the only California 14ers not (at least partly) in Inyo County
 The largest escarpment in the United States, rising from the floor of Death Valley to the top of Telescope Peak in the Panamint Range

Geography
Mount Whitney, the highest peak in the contiguous United States, is on Inyo County's western border (with Tulare County). The Badwater Basin in Death Valley National Park, the lowest place in North America, is in eastern Inyo County. They are not visible from each other, but both can be observed from the Panamint Range on the west side of Death Valley, above the Panamint Valley. Thus, Inyo County has the greatest elevation difference among all of the counties and county-equivalents in the contiguous United States.

It is the second-largest county by area in California and the ninth-largest in the United States (excluding boroughs and census areas in Alaska).

Lakes

 Camp Lake
 Cottonwood Lakes
 Diaz Lake
 Dingleberry Lake
 Granite Lake
 Inconsolable Lake
 Loch Leven
 Mills Lake
 Pee Wee Lake
 Robinson Lake
 Rock Creek Lake
 Lake Sabrina
 Weir Lake
 Wishbone Lake

National protected areas
 Death Valley National Park (part)
 Inyo National Forest (part)
 Manzanar National Historic Site

There are 22 official wilderness areas in Inyo County that are part of the National Wilderness Preservation System. This is the second-largest number of any county, exceeded only by San Bernardino County's 35 wilderness areas. Most of these are managed solely by the Bureau of Land Management, but four are integral components of Death Valley National Park or Inyo National Forest and are thus managed by either the National Park Service or the Forest Service. Some of these wilderness areas also extend into neighboring counties.

Except as noted, the wilderness areas are managed solely by the Bureau of Land Management and lie entirely within Inyo County:

 Argus Range Wilderness
 Coso Range Wilderness
 Darwin Falls Wilderness
 Death Valley Wilderness (part)
 Funeral Mountains Wilderness
 Golden Trout Wilderness (part)
 Ibex Wilderness
 Inyo Mountains Wilderness (part)
 John Muir Wilderness (part)
 Malpais Mesa Wilderness
 Manly Peak Wilderness
 Nopah Range Wilderness
 Owens Peak Wilderness (part)
 Pahrump Valley Wilderness (part)
 Piper Mountain Wilderness
 Resting Spring Range Wilderness
 Sacatar Trail Wilderness (part)
 Saddle Peak Hills Wilderness (part)
 South Nopah Range Wilderness
 South Sierra Wilderness (part)
 Surprise Canyon Wilderness
 Sylvania Mountains Wilderness

Death Valley National Park

Death Valley National Park is a mostly arid United States National Park east of the Sierra Nevada mountain range in southern Inyo County and northern San Bernardino County in California, with a small extension into southwestern Nye County and extreme southern Esmeralda County in Nevada. In addition, there is an exclave (Devil's Hole) in southern Nye County. Death Valley National Monument was proclaimed in 1933, placing the area under federal protection. In 1994, the monument was redesignated a national park, as well as being substantially expanded to include Saline and Eureka Valleys.

It is the hottest and driest of the national parks in the United States. It is home to many species of plants and animals that have adapted to this harsh desert environment. Some examples include Creosote Bush, Bighorn Sheep, Coyote, and the Death Valley Pupfish, a survivor of much wetter times. Approximately 95% of the park is designated as wilderness. Death Valley National Park is visited annually by more than 770,000 visitors who come to enjoy its diverse geologic features, desert wildlife, historic sites, scenery, clear night skies, and the solitude of the extreme desert environment.

Other parks
 Alabama Hills Recreation Area
 Last Chance Meadow Research Natural Area
 California Bighorn Sheep Zoological Area

Demographics

2020 census

Note: the US Census treats Hispanic/Latino as an ethnic category. This table excludes Latinos from the racial categories and assigns them to a separate category. Hispanics/Latinos can be of any race.

2011

Places by population, race, and income

2010 Census
The 2010 United States Census reported that Inyo County had a population of 18,546. The racial makeup of Inyo County was 13,741 (74.1%) White, 109 (0.6%) African American, 2,121 (11.4%) Native American, 243 (1.3%) Asian, 16 (0.1%) Pacific Islander, 1,676 (9.0%) from other races, and 640 (3.5%) from two or more races. Hispanic or Latino of any race were 3,597 persons (19.4%).

2000
At the 2000 census, there were 17,945 people, 7,703 households and 4,937 families residing in the county. The population density was 2 per square mile (1/km2). There were 9,042 housing units at an average density of 1 per square mile (0/km2). The racial makeup of the county was 80.1% White, 0.2% Black or African American, 10.0% Native American, 0.9% Asian, 0.1% Pacific Islander, 4.6% from other races, and 4.2% from two or more races. 12.6% of the population were Hispanic or Latino of any race. 16.4% were of German, 12.2% English, 10.6% Irish and 5.0% American ancestry according to Census 2000. 89.2% spoke English and 9.3% Spanish as their first language.

There were 7,703 households, of which 27.9% had children under the age of 18 living with them, 49.8% were married couples living together, 9.9% had a female householder with no husband present, and 35.9% were non-families. 31.4% of all households were made up of individuals, and 13.6% had someone living alone who was 65 years of age or older.  The average household size was 2.31 and the average family size was 2.88.

24.4% of the population were under the age of 18, 5.8% from 18 to 24, 23.4% from 25 to 44, 27.3% from 45 to 64, and 19.1% who were 65 years of age or older. The median age was 43 years. For every 100 females there were 95.4 males. For every 100 females age 18 and over, there were 92.9 males.

The median household income was $35,006 and the median family income was $44,970. Males had a median income of $37,270 versus $25,549 for females. The per capita income for the county was $19,639. About 9.3% of families and 12.6% of the population were below the poverty line, including 16.0% of those under age 18 and 8.3% of those age 65 or over.

Politics

Voter registration

Cities by population and voter registration

Overview 
Inyo has been a strongly Republican county in Presidential and congressional elections. From 1944 to 2016, the only Democrat to win the county (and the last to win a majority of its vote) was Lyndon Johnson in 1964. However, the county shifted decisively leftward in 2020, narrowly supporting Joe Biden over Donald Trump. Inyo is still a reliably Republican county down ballot, with it most recently voting Republican in the 2022 gubernatorial election. 

On November 4, 2008, Inyo County voted 60.6% for Proposition 8 which amended the California Constitution to ban same-sex marriages.

Crime 

The following table includes the number of incidents reported and the rate per 1,000 persons for each type of offense.

Cities by population and crime rates

County Sheriffs

W. A. Greenly (22 Mar 1866- 7 Nov 1867)
William A. Moore (7 Nov 1867- 7 Nov 1875)
Thomas Passmore (7 Nov 1875- 10 Feb 1878)- Killed On Duty
William A. Moore (10 Feb 1878- 4 Jul 1879) - Killed On Duty
Samuel S. Gregg (4 Jul 1879- 7 Nov 1888)
Fred Charles Scott (7 Nov 1888- 7 Nov 1896)
Charles Albert Collins ( 7 Nov 1896- 7 Nov 1916)
Boone Newett (7 Nov 1916- 7 Nov 1918)
Frank Logan (7 Nov 1918- 7 Nov 1924)
Charles Albert Collins (7 Nov 1924-7 Nov 1926)
Tom Hutchinson (7 Nov 1926- 7 Nov 1934)
Emmett L. Shay (7 Nov 1934- 7 Nov 1942)
Charles P. Cline (7 Nov 1942- 7 Nov 1954)
Merrill Howard (7 Nov 1954- 7 Nov 1960)
Merrill Franklin Culbertson (7 Nov 1960- 7 Nov 1962)
Merrill L. Curtis (7 Nov 1962- 7 Nov 1970)
Floyd Barton (7 Nov 1970- 7 Nov 1982)
Floyd Tidwell (7 Nov 1982- 7 Nov 1984)
Don Dorsey (7 Nov 1984- 7 Nov 1996)
Dan Lucas ( 7 Nov 1996- 7 Nov 2006)
 William R. "Bill " Lutze (7 Nov 2006- )

Education
School districts in Inyo County are:
 Big Pine Unified School District
 Bishop Unified School District
 Bishop Union High School District
 Bishop Union Elementary School District
 Death Valley Unified School District
 Lone Pine Unified School District
 Owens Valley Unified School District
 Round Valley School District

Deep Springs College is a two-year alternative education college in Deep Springs Valley.

Higher education in Inyo County is provided by the Kern Community College District. With cerro coso community college campus located in Bishop CA

Notable locations
 Mushroom Rock
Mount Whitney
Death Valley National Park
Badwater Basin
Lake Manly
This may be the highest natural ground surface temperature ever recorded.)

Transportation
In the 1920s, automobile clubs and nearby towns started to lobby for trans-Sierra highways over Piute Pass and other locations. However, by end of the 1920s, the Forest Service and the Sierra Club decided that roadless wilderness in the Sierra was valuable, and fought the proposal. The Piute Pass proposal faded out by the early 1930s, with the Forest Service proposing a route over Minaret Summit in 1933. The Minaret Summit route was lobbied against by California's Governor Ronald Reagan in 1972. The expansion of the John Muir and Ansel Adams Wildernesses in the 1980s sealed off the Minaret Summit route.

A trans-Sierra route between Porterville and Lone Pine was proposed by local businessmen in 1923. Eventually, a circuitous route across the Sierra was built across the only trans-Sierra route south of Yosemite: Sherman Pass by 1976. That route is Forest Route 22S05 to the west, and Kennedy Meadow Road (County Route J41) and 9-Mile Canyon Road to the east.

Major highways
  U.S. Route 6
  U.S. Route 395
  State Route 127
  State Route 136
  State Route 168
  State Route 178
  State Route 190

Public transportation
Eastern Sierra Transit Authority operates intercity bus service along US 395, as well as local services in Bishop. Service extends south to Lancaster (Los Angeles County) and north to Reno, Nevada.

Airports
Bishop Airport, Independence Airport, Lone Pine Airport and Shoshone Airport are general aviation airports located near their respective cities. Stovepipe Wells Airport and Furnace Creek Airport are located in Death Valley National Park.

Communities

Cities
 Bishop

Census-designated places

 Big Pine
 Cartago
 Charleston View
 Darwin
 Dixon Lane-Meadow Creek
 Furnace Creek
 Homewood Canyon
 Independence (county seat)
 Keeler
 Lone Pine
 Mesa
 Olancha
 Pearsonville
 Round Valley
 Shoshone
 Tecopa
 Trona
 Valley Wells
 West Bishop
 Wilkerson

Other unincorporated communities
 Alabama Hills
 Charleston
 Chicago Valley
  Coso_Junction
 Death Valley Junction
 Deep Springs
 Dunmovin
  Haiwee
 Laws
Panamint Springs
 Sandy Valley
 Stewart Valley

Population ranking
The population ranking of the following table is based on the 2010 census of Inyo County.

† county seat

See also

 National Register of Historic Places listings in Inyo County, California

Notes

References

External links

 Inyo County Tourism website
 Eastern California Museum

 
California counties
California placenames of Native American origin
1866 establishments in California
Populated places established in 1865